Gert Dirk Jacobus Alberts (born 17 January 1991 in Johannesburg, South Africa) is a South African rugby union player, currently playing with the . His regular playing position is lock.

Career

Youth

He was included in the  squad for the 2009 Academy Week squad, but then made the short move to East Rand-based side , where he represented the  side during the 2010 Under-19 Provincial Championship competition and the  side in the 2011 Under-21 Provincial Championship.

Falcons

His made his senior debut as a 20-year-old when he started in the ' 2011 Vodacom Cup match against , his only appearance of the season. After further involvement with the Under-21 side during the latter half of 2011, he returned to the first team for the 2012 Vodacom Cup competition, making five appearances.

He started all seven of the Falcons' matches during the 2013 Vodacom Cup competition and was part of the matchday squad for 12 of their 14 matches during the 2013 Currie Cup First Division season, making three starts and coming off the bench on six occasions.

References

South African rugby union players
Living people
1991 births
Rugby union players from Johannesburg
Rugby union locks
Falcons (rugby union) players